Pachnistis craniota is a moth in the family Autostichidae. It was described by Edward Meyrick in 1913. It is found in South Africa.

The wingspan is 12–14 mm. The forewings are bronzy grey or dark purplish fuscous, suffusedly irrorated (sprinkled) with dark fuscous. The hindwings are grey whitish.

References

Endemic moths of South Africa
Moths described in 1913
Pachnistis
Taxa named by Edward Meyrick